William Osborne Kyle (July 14, 1914 – February 23, 1966) was an American jazz pianist. He is perhaps best known as an accompanist.

Biography
Kyle was born in Philadelphia, Pennsylvania, United States. He began playing the piano in school and by the early 1930s worked with Lucky Millinder, Tiny Bradshaw and later the Mills Blue Rhythm Band. In 1938, he joined John Kirby's sextet, but was drafted in 1942. After the war, he worked with Kirby's band briefly and also worked with Sy Oliver. He then spent thirteen years as a member of Louis Armstrong's All-Stars, and performed in the 1956 musical High Society. 

A fluent pianist with a light touch, Kyle always worked steadily. He died in Youngstown, Ohio.

Kyle had few opportunities to record as a leader and none during his Armstrong years, some octet and septet sides in 1937, two songs with a quartet in 1939, and outings in 1946 with a trio and an octet. He was the co-author of the song "Billy's Bounce", recorded by the Modern Jazz Quartet in 1992 with Bobby McFerrin on the album, MJQ and Friends.

Discography

As sideman
 Louis Armstrong Plays W. C. Handy (Columbia, 1954)
 Satch Plays Fats (Columbia, 1955)
 At Newport (Columbia, 1956)
 Louis and the Angels (Decca, 1957)
 Satchmo On Stage (Decca, 1957)
 Satchmo Plays King Oliver (Audio Fidelity, 1960)
 Hello, Dolly! (Kapp, 1964)
 At the Crescendo (MCA, 1973)

With others
 Dave Brubeck, Summit Sessions (Columbia, 1971)
 Buck Clayton, Buck Clayton Jams Benny Goodman (Columbia, 1955)
 Buck Clayton, Jumpin' at the Woodside (Columbia, 1955)
 Ella Fitzgerald, Ella Sings Gershwin (Decca, 1956)
 Al Hibbler, After the Lights Go Down Low (Atlantic, 1957)
 John Kirby, Biggest Little Band in the Land (DJM, 1975)
 Charlie Shavers, The Complete Charlie Shavers with Maxine Sullivan (Bethlehem, 1957)
 Rex Stewart, Rex Stewart and the Ellingtonians (Riverside, 1960)

References

External links
MIDI sequences of ''5 Blues Piano Solos by Billy Kyle
 Billy Kyle recordings at the Discography of American Historical Recordings.

1914 births
1966 deaths
American jazz pianists
American male pianists
Musicians from Philadelphia
20th-century American pianists
Jazz musicians from Pennsylvania
20th-century American male musicians
American male jazz musicians
Mills Blue Rhythm Band members